Athittayawong (born 1620) was the shortest-reigning monarch of Ayutthaya, only for 36 days in 1629 and the last king of the Sukhothai dynasty.

Prince Athitayawong was the son of King Songtham and his principal wife. His elder brother, King Chetthathirat and his mother were executed in 1629 after Okya Siworawong or Phraya Siworawong staged a coup.

The Puppet King
The ten-year-old child prince was raised to the throne by Siworawong. However, Siworawong continued to administer the country as Chaophraya Kalahom.  After about a month, the government servants complained that there were in fact two rulers in the country, Athittayawong and Siworawong administering as a king, which could cause future danger for the country.  They persuaded Siworawong to ascend to the throne so there would be only one king as per custom.  Athittayawong was dethroned and Siworawong assumed the title Somdet Phrachao Prasat Thong.

Death
Athitayawong was executed at Wat Kok Phraya soon after being deposed, ending the Sukhothai dynasty. Siworawong ascended the throne as the first king of the Prasat Thong dynasty.

Ancestry

Notes

See also
 List of Siamese Monarchs

1618 births
17th-century deaths
Sukhothai dynasty
Kings of Ayutthaya
Monarchs deposed as children
Child monarchs from Asia
17th-century monarchs in Asia
Executed Thai monarchs
Princes of Ayutthaya
Executed children
Murdered Thai children